Jordan McDeere is a fictional character on the United States television series Studio 60 on the Sunset Strip, played by Amanda Peet.

Personal history
Jordan is the president of the fictional National Broadcasting System, a great achievement for a woman of her age. Her employment record includes two years in Business Affairs at Atlantic Records, two as Vice President in charge of production at United Artists and four years at NBS. She got her B.A. in American Studies at Amherst College and a J.D. at Yale Law School after twelve years of Catholic school. She's from Charlottesville, Virginia originally.

When she was 25, Jordan was married for nine months to Ryan Mulrooney, whose idea of "fun" involved taking his wife to sex clubs. She divorced him and used to pay him alimony; Mulrooney is working on an upcoming self-published book: Confessions of a Network Husband: My Life With Jordan McDeere.

In 1999 Jordan terminated a pregnancy.

In "West Coast Delay" she tries to get Danny Tripp to listen to a pitch to allow product placement on Studio 60, arguing that it will be marketed to the most coveted group, the "Alpha Consumers," "they're the first to know, the first to try, the first to buy."

In "B-12", Jordan tells Danny Tripp that she is pregnant. Jordan's pregnancy was written into the script following the September news of Peet's real-life pregnancy. The father is her ex-boyfriend who had previously given Jordan the information that Danny had failed his drug test, which led to his and Matt's being signed to Studio 60. During the final episode of 2006, Tripp announced to McDeere that he intended to pursue her romantically, to which she gave no reply (possibly due to having a mouth full of food at the time).

In Harriet Dinner Part II, she reveals her attraction towards Danny and the two subsequently start a relationship (but do not reveal it to the public).

In K&R - Part I, Danny proposes to Jordan on her way in to the operating room for a C-Section. Jordan exclaims, "God,Yes!" and the two become engaged. At the end of the series, she has Danny sign adoption papers for their daughter, Rebecca Tripp.

See also
 List of Studio 60 on the Sunset Strip characters

References

Fictional characters from Virginia
Fictional broadcasters
Fictional female businesspeople
Television characters introduced in 2006